The High Commissioner of South Africa to Australia is an officer of the South African Department of International Relations and Cooperation and the head of the High Commission of the Republic of South Africa to the Commonwealth of Australia. The position has the rank and status of an Ambassador Extraordinary and Plenipotentiary and holds non-resident accreditation as Ambassador to the Marshall Islands and the Federated States of Micronesia. The High Commissioner is based with the High Commission in Yarralumla in Canberra.

The High Commissioner is currently Beryl Sisulu, a career diplomat, and South Africa and Australia have enjoyed diplomatic relations since 1949. On South Africa's departure from the Commonwealth of Nations in 1961, the High Commission became an Embassy. Following the end of Apartheid and South Africa's return to the Commonwealth on 1 June 1994, the High Commission was re-established to replace the former Embassy.

Office-holders

High Commissioners from the Union of South Africa, 1949–61

Ambassadors from the Republic of South Africa, 1961–94

High Commissioners from the Republic of South Africa, 1994 to date

See also

Australia–South Africa relations
Foreign relations of South Africa
List of Australian high commissioners to South Africa

References

External links
South African High Commission, Canberra

 
Australia
South Africa
South Africa
Australia and the Commonwealth of Nations
South Africa and the Commonwealth of Nations